Douglas Dexter (5 January 1887 – 21 September 1937) was a British fencer. He competed in the individual and team épée events at the 1936 Summer Olympics.

References

1887 births
1937 deaths
British male fencers
Olympic fencers of Great Britain
Fencers at the 1936 Summer Olympics